Štrbské pleso (or ) is a picturesque mountain lake of glacial origin and a top tourist destination in the High Tatras, Slovakia. It is the second-largest glacial lake on the Slovak side of the High Tatras, after Veľké Hincovo pleso. Maximum depth is 20 metres (66 ft).

Description 
Štrbské pleso is now part of the neighborhood of Štrbské Pleso (spelled with a capital P). It is on the municipal lands of the village of Štrba, after which Štrbské pleso ("Lake Štrba") is now named. The word pleso ("tarn") is applied only to mountain lakes. The locals used to call it "the puddle" or "pond" (mláka) in the past. It is fed by underground springs and has no visible outflow stream. Its surface remains frozen for around 155 days per year.

See also

Tatra mountains
Tourism in Slovakia
Vysoké Tatry (town)

References

Lakes of Slovakia
Spiš
Lakes of the High Tatras
Glacial lakes
Geography of Prešov Region